Barbara Berezowski (born September 5, 1954) is a Canadian former ice dancer.  With partner David Porter, she won two gold medals at the Canadian Figure Skating Championships and competed at the 1976 Winter Olympics.  From 1994 through 2008, she served as Founding Chairperson of the Board of Governors of the Etobicoke Sports Hall of Fame. She was inducted into their athlete category in 1999.

Berezowski / Porter retired from amateur competition in 1976 and then performed in ice shows, including Toller Cranston's The Ice Show and later Ice Follies.

Competitive highlights
(with Porter)

Berezowski was named "Miss Charm on Ice" at the 1974 and 1975 Prize of Moscow News. In 1976, Berezowski/Porter became the first ice dancers in the world to become Olympians. Berezowski was selected as "Miss Olympics" at the 1976 Winter Olympic Games, Innsbruck, Austria by world journalists. She also won the title of "Miss Toronto" 1975-1976 and was a finalist in the 1976 Miss Canada Beauty Pageant.

Professional career
 1976-1977 Berezowski/Porter turned professional and toured with Toller Cranston's "The Ice Show"
 1977 World Professional Dance Champions - 1st Jaca, Spain
 1978-1980 Toured with Ice Follies.
 1982 Headlined in Professional Ice Show in "Stars on Ice" Seoul, Korea
 1999 Performed in "Legendary Night of Figure Skating" celebrating Canadian figure skating champions, Air Canada Centre, Toronto Canada

References

External links 
 
 

1954 births
Canadian female ice dancers
Figure skaters at the 1976 Winter Olympics
Living people
Olympic figure skaters of Canada
Figure skaters from Toronto